Roseveare is a surname, and may refer to:

 Bob Roseveare (1923–2004), codebreaker at Bletchley Park during World War II 
 Helen Roseveare (1925–2016), English Christian missionary, doctor and author
 Ione Roseveare (1921–2010), Bletchley Park staff
 Martin Roseveare (1898-1985), mathematician
 Richard Roseveare (1902–1972), Anglican bishop in Africa